Augustin Buzura (September 22, 1938 – July 10, 2017) was a Romanian novelist and short story writer, also known as a journalist, essayist and literary critic. A member of the Romanian Academy, he has been the president of the Romanian Cultural Foundation since 1990 and president of the Romanian Cultural Institute between 2003 and 2004.

Biography
Born in Berinţa village, Copalnic-Mănăștur commune (Maramureș County), Buzura graduated from Gheorghe Şincai National College in Baia Mare and attended the Faculty of Medicine and Pharmacy in Cluj (1958–1964), specializing in psychiatry. He debuted as a journalist with articles published by the magazine Tribuna during 1960.

Augustin's Buzura first published work was the 1963 collection of short stories, Capul Bunei Speranţe ("Cape of Good Hope"). He continued to publish regularly after that date, receiving critical acclaim and being awarded the Romanian Writers' Union prize three times, for the successive works Absenţii ("The Absentees"), Feţele tăcerii ("The Faces of Silence") and Vocile nopţii ("The Voices in the Night").

Works
Capul Bunei Speranţe, 1963, Cape of Good Hope
De ce zboara vulturii, 1967, Why Do Eagles Fly
Absenţii, 1970, The Unpresents
Orgolii, 1974, Prides
Feţele tăcerii, 1974, Silence's Faces
Vocile nopţii, 1980, Night's Voices
Bloc-notes, 1981, Block-notes 
Refugii, 1984, Refugees
Drumul cenuşii, 1988, Cinder's Road
Recviem pentru nebuni şi bestii, 1999, Requiem for the Crazy & the Beasts
Raport asupra singurătăţii, 2009, Solitude's Report

References

1938 births
2017 deaths
Titular members of the Romanian Academy
Romanian essayists
Romanian journalists
Romanian literary critics
Romanian novelists
Romanian male novelists
Romanian male short story writers
Romanian short story writers
People from Maramureș County
Male essayists
Iuliu Hațieganu University of Medicine and Pharmacy alumni